Florian Latorre (born April 24, 1997 in Libourne, France) is a French racing driver from Auriolles, France. He currently competes in the FIA World Endurance Championship for TF Sport.

Career
Latorre made his professional debut in the 2013 U.S. F2000 National Championship. He returned and won the 2014 series championship. His championship won him a scholarship to compete in the 2015 Pro Mazda Championship season. He drove for Cape Motorsports, the team with which he won his U.S. F2000 title.

FIA World Endurance Championship
On January 19, 2022, TF Sport announced that Latorre would make a full-season return to the World Endurance championship in 2022, piloting the #33 Aston Martin Vantage AMR alongside Ben Keating and Marco Sørensen.

Racing record

Career summary

† As Latorre was a guest driver, therefore he was ineligible for points.

American open–wheel racing results

U.S. F2000 National Championship

Pro Mazda Championship

Complete Porsche Supercup results
(key) (Races in bold indicate pole position) (Races in italics indicate fastest lap)

† Driver did not finish the race, but was classified as he completed over 90% of the race distance.
⹋ No points awarded as less than 50% of race distance was completed.
‡ As Latorre was a guest driver, therefore he was ineligible for points.

Complete 24 Hours of Le Mans results

Complete FIA World Endurance Championship results
(key) (Races in bold indicate pole position; races in italics indicate fastest lap)

References

External links

 
 

1997 births
Living people
People from Libourne
French racing drivers
French F4 Championship drivers
Indy Pro 2000 Championship drivers
U.S. F2000 National Championship drivers
Sportspeople from Gironde
Porsche Supercup drivers
24 Hours of Le Mans drivers
FIA World Endurance Championship drivers
Auto Sport Academy drivers
Belardi Auto Racing drivers
Wayne Taylor Racing drivers
Porsche Carrera Cup Germany drivers